Alba-Golden High School is a public secondary school located in Alba, Texas (USA) and classified as a 2A school by the UIL. It is part of the Alba-Golden Independent School District located in west central Wood County. It is a consolidation of the nearby communities of Alba and Golden. In 2015, the school was rated "Met Standard" by the Texas Education Agency.

Activities

Band
The Alba-Golden High School Prowling Panther Band is a well-known band in Wood County. It usually receives good ratings in competitions and has members in the East Texas High School All-Region Honor Band every year. They host two concerts every school year, a Christmas concert in December and a spring concert in May. During the 2011-2012 school year, the band made a division one at the regional University Interscholastic League (UIL) marching contest, thus sending them to the Area UIL marching contest for the first time in over two decades. They made division one in the 2015-2016 school year, sending them to the Area UIL marching contest again, being the second time this happened since the 1990s but haven’t won a single competition since.

Drama and Theater
Alba-Golden hosts a number of successful theatrical productions every school year.

Organizations
Alba-Golden has several different student organizations. They range from the area of politics to the subject of agriculture.

List of Organizations
FCA
FFA
FCCLA
Gifted/Talented
Media Tech
National Honor Society
Red Curtain Company
Spanish Club
Student Council

Cheerleading
Alba-Golden has very talented cheerleading squads. In the 2007-2008 school year, the junior high cheerleaders won nationals for AA schools.

Athletics
The Alba-Golden Panthers compete in these sports - 

Cross Country, Volleyball, Football, Basketball, Golf, Tennis, Track, Softball & Baseball. 

Players to come through AG were Cory Clark. Clark was one of the best High School players in the state from 2004/2007. His senior year he averaged 29.0ppg and was named All state, region, and all east Texas. He led the state of TX in Three pointers made and was second in scoring in 1-5 A basketball

References

External links
Alba-Golden ISD

Public high schools in Texas
Schools in Wood County, Texas
Public middle schools in Texas